Two submarines of the United States Navy have been named Bass after the spiny-finned fish.

See also

Sources
 

United States Navy ship names